The Periodic Table: Elements with Style is a 2007 children's science book created by Simon Basher and written by Adrian Dingle. It is the first book in Basher's science series, which includes Physics: Why Matter Matters!, Biology: Life As We Know It, Astronomy: Out of this World!, Rocks and Minerals: A Gem of a Book, and Planet Earth: What Planet Are You On?, each of which is 128 pages long.

The book is arranged in eleven chapters plus an introduction, and includes a poster in the back of the book. Each chapter is on a different group of the periodic table (hydrogen, the alkali metals, the alkaline earth metals, the transition metals, the boron elements, the carbon elements, the nitrogen elements, the oxygen elements, the halogen elements, the noble gases, the lanthanides and actinides, and the transactinides). For every type of then known atom, Basher has created a "manga-esque" cartoon, and for many types of atoms, Dingle, a high-school chemistry teacher who also developed an award-winning chemistry website has written a couple paragraphs of facts to go with the cartoon.  Dingle, who says that "[s]cience is a serious business", wanted in writing the book "to get people engaged is to make it accessible while still presenting hard facts and knowledge," while Basher was concerned that the book's design be "sharp and focused" in order to "connect with today's visually advanced young audience."

Critical response
Publishers Weekly said that the book was a "lively introduction to the chart that has been the bane of many a chemistry student", and in a review in New Scientist, Vivienne Greig called The Periodic Table "an engrossing read and an ideal way to painlessly impart a great deal of science history to seen-it-all-before teenagers."  A review on the Royal Society of Chemistry website had some minor reservations about the book, but said it was "endearing" and succeeded in making learning chemistry easier and more fun.

The Periodic Table: Elements with Style has also been reviewed in the Bulletin of the Center for Children's Books and the Journal of Chemical Education.

References

External links
 Simon Basher's website
 Adrian Dingle's award-winning chemistry website
 Kingfisher - publisher's website
 The Periodic Table - publisher's book page
 Basher books website

Periodic table in popular culture
2007 non-fiction books
Chemistry books
2007 children's books